The Kenya national rugby sevens team competes in the World Rugby Sevens Series, Rugby World Cup Sevens and the Commonwealth Games. They are currently one of the 15 "core teams" of the World Series, with a guaranteed place in all 10 events each season. Kenya recorded its first tournament win in the World Rugby Sevens Series after beating Fiji at the 2016 Singapore Sevens.
Kenya has also been successful in the Rugby World Cup Sevens, reaching the semifinals in 2009 and again in 2013.

The Kenya Sevens team is sometimes referred to by the Kenyan and international press as Shujaa, a Swahili word meaning courage, confidence, bravery, or heroism. The Kenya national rugby sevens team is one of the more successful sporting teams representing Kenya. They have won the men's Team of the Year category six times at the Kenyan Sports Personality of the Year Awards: 2004, 2007, 2008, 2009, 2013, and 2016.

Honors
 Main Cup winners at the 2016 Singapore Sevens 
 Main cup finalists at the
2009 Adelaide Sevens
2013 Wellington Sevens
2018 Canada Sevens
2018 Hong Kong Sevens

World Rugby Sevens Series

Kenya has competed in the World Series every year since the competition's inception in 1999–2000. Kenya's best season came in 2012–13 when they finished fifth in the Series. Collins Injera and Humphrey Kayange were both nominated for World Rugby Sevens Player of the Year in 2009, but lost to England's Ollie Phillips.

Tournament history

Summer Olympic Games

Rugby World Cup Sevens

Commonwealth Games

Africa Cup Sevens

Safari Sevens 
Kenya has won the Safari Sevens ten times:
 1997 versus Cumbria Schoolboys 24–27,
 2000 Kenya 'A' (Shujaa) won, defeating Bristol University RFC, 26–24
 2003 versus Emerging Springboks 29–7,
 2004 versus Emerging Springboks 10–7,
 2008 versus Zimbabwe 35–12,
 2009 versus Emerging Springboks 40–19,
 2010 versus Emerging Springboks 17–12,
 2014 versus Australia Renegades 40–7,
 2016 versus Samurai International 38–21
 2019 versus Springbok Sevens 19–12.

Team

Current squad

Former squads

Squad for the 2017–18 Sevens Series

Player records
The following refers to statistics generated in the World Rugby Sevens Series. Players in bold are still active.
Collins Injera was briefly ranked the #1 player in the world in tries scored, until his try-scoring record was surpassed by England's Dan Norton.

See also
 Rugby union in Kenya
 Kenya national rugby union team
 Kenya Rugby Union

References

External links
Official website
WorldRugby profile

National rugby sevens teams
Sevens